The Schreder HP-17 was an American mid-wing, V tailed, single seat, experimental glider designed by Richard Schreder to test a new airfoil section.

Design and development
The HP-17 was designed to test a new airfoil section, the Wortmann FX 72 MS-150A. This airfoil is a high-lift, low drag section that Scheder thought would be a good sailplane design.

The HP-17 is all-metal in construction, except for its foam wing ribs. The wing features water ballast carried inside the wing spar. The wing also has full-span flaps and spoilerons in place of ailerons.

Operational history
The HP-17 was given its baptism of fire in the 1973 US Nationals when Schreder flew it in the FAI 15 Metre Class. The aircraft placed 38th and thus was not deemed a success. After the competition it was not used again and Schreder tuned his attention to the much more successful HP-18 instead.

The HP-17 was retained by Schreder for many years, but in April 2011 it was no longer registered, not in the National Soaring Museum and its current whereabouts are unknown.

Specifications (HP-17)

See also

References

1970s United States sailplanes
Schreder aircraft
V-tail aircraft